The Max Planck Institute for Terrestrial Microbiology is a research institute for terrestrial microbiology in Marburg, Germany. Managing Director in 2020-2022 is Tobias J. Erb.

Goals 
The aim of the institute's work is to understand the function, communication and interaction of microorganisms with their environment, to describe these using mathematical models and to specifically modify them using synthetic biological approaches.

Research
The institute addresses the research areas and also other topics by conducting comprehensive basic research, from the atomic level to the ecosystem.

Research at the institute is carried out in four departments. In addition, the institute hosts two Max Planck Research Groups, two Emmy Noether Research Groups, four department-independent research groups, three Emeriti and two Max Planck Fellows.

Research Areas

 Metabolic activities of microorganisms in global metabolic cycles, their adaptations to environmental changes, their production of natural products of relevance to humans, and the mechanisms underlying the cell cycle and cell polarity
 Interactions of microorganisms among themselves and with plants and animals
 Utilization and targeted modification of microbial metabolic properties, including synthetic biology

Organisation and Structure 
The MPI-TM is organized in four departments, some of which comprise several working groups, as well as several independent junior research groups and central scientific service facilities.

Departments 

 Biochemistry and Synthetic Metabolism, Director: Tobias J. Erb

 Ecophysiology, Director: Lotte Søgaard-Andersen
 Natural Products in Organismic Interaktions, Director: Helge B. Bode
 System- und Synthetic Mikrobiology, Director: Victor Sourjik

Scientific members emeritus 

 Rudolf K. Thauer, Head of Department „Biochemistry“ 1991–2007
 Ralf Conrad, Head of Department „Biogeochemistry“ 1991–2016
 Regine Kahmann, Head of Department „Organismic Interactions“ 2000–2020

History
The Max Planck Institute for Terrestrial Microbiology was founded in Marburg on January 1, 1991; Founding Director was Rudolf K. Thauer. In 1991, the first two departments were established: the Department of "Biochemistry" led by Rudolf K. Thauer and the Department of "Biogeochemistry" led by Ralf Conrad, which were initially housed in a transitional building and in the facilities of the Department of Biology at Philipps University. On April 1, 1996, the departments moved to a new building near this faculty. A further department "Organismic Interactions" (Head: Regine Kahmann) joined in 2000.

In 2004, the department "Biochemistry" was resized to a department independent junior group. At the same time, the department "Ecophysiology" was established under the leadership of Lotte Søgaard-Andersen. After Rudolf K. Thauer retired in 2007, the department "Biochemistry" was closed.

In 2013, Victor Sourjik started the department "Systems and Synthetic Microbiology". This is also part of the LOEWE Research Center for Synthetic Microbiology (SYNMIKRO) and is located in the university building next to the main MPI-TM building.

The Department of Biogeochemistry was closed in 2017 after Ralf Conrad retired. Under the leadership of Tobias J. Erb, the department "Biochemistry and Synthetic Metabolism" was newly established.

International Max Planck Research School (IMPRS) 
The Max Planck Institute for Terrestrial Microbiology runs the International Max Planck Research School "Principles of Microbial Life: From molecules to cells, from cells to interactions" together with the Philipps University of Marburg. The IMPRS is a PhD program conducted in English. It consists of about 30 research groups. Research projects can be carried out in research groups at the Max Planck Institute, the LOEWE Center for Synthetic Microbiology (SYNMIKRO) or the Philipps University of Marburg. The doctoral degree is awarded by the Philipps-Universität Marburg. Speaker of the IMPRS is Tobias J. Erb.

References
Roland H. Knauer: Max-Planck-Institut für Terrestrische Mikrobiologie. Vorwort von Ralf Conrad und Rudolf K. Thauer. Hrsg. von der Max-Planck-Gesellschaft, München 1997 (Reihe: Berichte und Mitteilungen der Max-Planck-Gesellschaft, Heft 1997/5), ISSN 0341-7778

External links
 Homepage 
 Publications of the Institute in the eDoc-Server of the MPS
 The IMPRS-Mic Phd Program
 SYNMIKRO Homepage

Terrestrial Microbiology
Biogeochemistry
Genetics in Germany
Microbiology institutes